Nedra is a genus of moths of the family Noctuidae.

Species
 Nedra albiclava (Druce, 1908)
 Nedra dora Clarke, 1940
 Nedra goniosema (Hampson, 1909)
 Nedra hoeffleri Clarke, 1940
 Nedra peruviana (Hampson, 1914)
 Nedra ramosula (Guenée, 1851)
 Nedra stewarti (Grote, 1875)
 Nedra tropicalis (Schaus, 1911)

References
Natural History Museum Lepidoptera genus database
Nedra at funet

Xyleninae
Noctuoidea genera